Xenorhina oxycephala is a species of frog in the family Microhylidae.
It is found in New Guinea.
Its natural habitats are subtropical or tropical moist lowland forests, rural gardens, urban areas, and heavily degraded former forest.

References

Xenorhina
Amphibians of New Guinea
Taxonomy articles created by Polbot
Amphibians described in 1858